The Night of Speed was the rare occurrence when three men set the world record in the 100 metres in the same

History
On Thursday, June 20, 1968, two semi-final races were held as part of the AAU National Championships held at Hughes Stadium in Sacramento, California.  

At the time, the world record for the 100 metres was 10.0 seconds, hand timed, set and equalled over the years by Armin Hary (Germany) and Harry Jerome (Canada) in 1960, Horacio Esteves (Venezuela) and Bob Hayes (United States) in 1964, Jim Hines (United States) and Enrique Figuerola (Cuba) in 1967, and by Paul Nash (South Africa) and Oliver Ford (United States) earlier in 1968.

Minutes later in the second semi-final, with a  aiding wind Greene was also given the same time. As this was before the acceptance of fully automatic timing, the hand times were official, each recorded by three separate hand timed stopwatches. An experimental Accutrack automatic timing device was being used for this meet: the times recorded by it showed Hines ran 10.03, Smith 10.14, and Greene 10.10, information held for the interest of future track statisticians.

Later that evening, Greene went on to win the National Championship, in a wind aided 

Later that year, with the assistance of the altitude of Mexico City at the 1968 Olympics, Hines improved the record to 9.95 while winning the gold medal on October 14, which was to become the first accepted fully automatic timed world record accepted when the IAAF adopted such times in 1977.  At those same Olympics, Greene took the bronze medal and all three teamed with Mel Pender to win the gold medal in the 4x100 m relay in world record time.  Over the next eight seasons, before the IAAF changed their record criteria, six more individuals tied the 9.9 hand timed world record.  The automatic 9.95 was not surpassed until 1983, when Calvin Smith ran 9.93, again at altitude, at the U.S. Air Force Academy near 

It is worth noting that Bob Hayes was timed at 9.9 seconds four years earlier in the final of the 100 metres at the 1964 Olympics in Tokyo.  The official time was given as 10.0 seconds because of an idiosyncratic method of measuring the 'hand' times, which were only used at that Olympics.

See also
 Men's 100 metres world record progression

References

USA Outdoor Track and Field Championships
100 metres
1968 in athletics (track and field)
1968 in California
World records in athletics
Sports in Sacramento, California
History of Sacramento, California
June 1968 sports events in North America
June 1968 sports events in the United States